Fengxi District is a district in eastern Guangdong Province, to the west of Fujian Province, near the South China Sea. The district covers 24.8 square kilometers and has a population of 106,200.

It is under the jurisdiction of Chaozhou.

See also
 Chaoshan

External links
Official website of Fengxi District Government

County-level divisions of Guangdong
Chaozhou